This article contains a list of the women's football clubs in Japan.  There are many football leagues, including WE League, Nadeshiko League,  and regional leagues.  Additionally there are leagues for University / College football clubs.

WE League

WE League (since 2021)
Albirex Niigata Ladies
Cerezo Osaka Sakai Ladies (from 2023–24)
Chifure AS Elfen Saitama
INAC Kobe Leonessa
JEF United Chiba Ladies
Mynavi Sendai Ladies
AC Nagano Parceiro Ladies
Nippon TV Tokyo Verdy Beleza
Nojima Stella Kanagawa Sagamihara
Omiya Ardija Ventus
Sanfrecce Hiroshima Regina
Urawa Red Diamonds Ladies

Nadeshiko League

Nadeshiko League Div.1 (from 2020)
NTV Beleza (Inagi, Tokyo)    (16)
INAC Kobe Leonessa (Kobe)    (3)
Nagano Parceiro (Nagano)
Mynavi Vegalta Sendai (Sendai)
Albirex Niigata (Seiro & Niigata, Niigata)
Nippon Sport Science University Fields Yokohama  (Yokohama)
JEF United Chiba (Ichihara, Chiba)
Urawa Red Diamonds (Saitama)     (3)
Nojima Stella (Sagamihara, Kanagawa)
Iga Kunoichi (Iga, Mie)     (2)

Nadeshiko League Div.2 (from 2020)
Elfen Saitama (Kawagoe, Saitama)
Yamato Sylphid (Yamato, Kanagawa)
Cerezo Osaka (Minamitsumori, Osaka) (Until 2022–23)
Ehime (Matsuyama, Ehime)
Sfida Setagaya (Setagaya, Tokyo)
Shizuoka Sagyo Univ (Iwata, Shizuoka) 
Harima (Himeji, Hyogo)
Nippatsu Yokohama F.C. Seagulls (Yokohama)
Bunnys Kyoto (Nagaokakyo, Kyoto)
Orca Kamogawa (Kamogawa, Chiba)

Challenge League (Div.3) (until 2020 defunct)

East
Yunogo Belle (Mimasaka, Okayama)
Norddea Hokkaido (Sapporo)
Tokiwagi Gakuen High School L.S.C. (Sendai)
Niigata University of Health and Welfare L.S.C. (Niigata)
Tsukuba F.C. Ladies (Tsukuba)
FC Jumonji Ventus (Tokyo)

West
Angeviolet Hiroshima (Hiroshima)
JFA Academy Fukushima L.F.C. (Fukushima)
Fukuoka J. Anclas (Kasuga, Fukuoka)
NGU Loveledge Nagoya (Nagoya)

Past participating
Nissan F.C. Ladies
Tokyo SHiDAX L.S.C. (ex Shinko Seiko F.C. Clair)
Fujita Soccer Club Mercury
Nikko Securities Dream Ladies
Shiroki F.C. Serena
OKI F.C. Winds
Suzuyo Shimizu F.C. Lovely Ladies
Urawa Ladies F.C.
Tasaki Perule F.C.
TEPCO Mareeze
Aguilas Kobe
Hoyo Sukarabu F.C.

Regional League
There are eight regional women's football/soccer leagues in Japan; Tohoku region does not have women's regional league.

Hokkaido
Hokkaido Bunkyo Univ. Meisei High School L.F.C.
Hokkaido　Otani Muroran High School L.F.C.
Sapporo Univ. L.S.C. Vista
Club Fields Linda
Otaru Hokusyo Corsa'rio
Hokkaido Lira Consadole

Hokushinetsu
Japan Soccer College Ladies
Niigata University of Health and Welfare L.S.C. 
Albirex Niigata Ladies U-18
Hokuriku University
F.C. Schloß Matsumoto
Toyama Ladies S.C.
Granscena Niigata F.C. Ladies
AC Shinsyu University
Fukui University of Technology L.F.C.
Japan Soccer College Ladies
AC Nagano Parceiro　Schwester

Kanto

Div.1
Waseda University Association F.C. Ladies
Urawa Red Diamonds Ladies Youth
JEF United Ichihara Chiba Ladies U-18
NTV Menina
Kantogakuen University L.S.C.
Tokyo International University L.S.C.
University of Tsukuba Women's Soccer Team
Kanagawa University L.S.C.

Div.2
Keiogijyuku University L.S.C.
Musashigaoka Jr. College Ciencia
Syobi University L.S.C.
Maebashiikuei High School
Mito Eiko F.C. Ibaragi Ladies
Kokushikan University L.S.C.
Toyo University L.S.C.
Nihonkouku High School L.S.C.

Tokai

Div.1
Fujieda Junshin High School
Tokoha Tachibana High School
Iga F.C. Kunoichi satellite
Aichi Toho University
NGU Loveledge Nagoya Youth
Shimizudaihachi Pleiades

Div.2
Iwata Higashi High School
Fujieda Junshin S.C. Junior Blue
Tokoha Tachibana junior High School
Shigakkan University
F.C. Gifu Belta
Lecre MYFC

Kansai

Div.1
Cerezo Osaka Sakai Girls
Daisho Gakuen High School L.S.C.
FC VICTORIES
Renaissgakuen Koga Ladies
Takarazuka El Baile Ladies F.C.
INAC Kobe Leoncheena
Kobe F.C. Ladies
F.C. Vitoria
Kyoto Shiko Soccer Club Ladies
Konomiya Speranza U-18

Div.2
Kainan F.C. Ladies SHOUT
F.C. Terra
F.C. Osaka CRAVO
Ritto F.C. Libro
Osaka City Lady's F.C.
Menina Kobe S.C.
Vispo Sayama
Ootsu Victories S.C.
Diablossa Takada F.C. Ladies
Riseisya F.C.

Chugoku
Tokuyama Univ. L.F.C
Hiroshima Ohkoh F.C. Ladies
Diosa Izumo F.C.
Freyia F.C. Venus
Aosaki Soccer Club HANAKO
F.C. RE'VE
Bingo Fucyu TAM-S
Yamato Nadeshiko
Sakuyo High School L.S.C.
Okayama Yunogo Belle U-18
Bunkyo High School L.S.C.
Iwakuni Angels

Shikoku
Kochi Ganador F.C.
Naruto Uzushio High School L.S.C.
Trefle F.C. Fille
Shikoku Gakuin University L.S.C.

Kyushu

Div.1
Yanagigaura High School L.S.C.
Kumamoto Renaissance FC
Fukuoka Jo-Gakuin High School L.S.C.
New Wave KitaKyusyu Ladies
Syugakukan High School L.S.C.
Ryukyu Deigos
Tokai Univ. Fukuoka Women's Football Team
Vicsale Okinawa Nabiita

Div.2
Kunimi F.C. Ladies
Oita Trinita Ladies
F.C. Alegre Caminho
Kumamoto United S.C.
Je Vrille Kagoshima
Melsa Kumamoto F.C.
Fukuoka J Anclas Nova
Tokai Univ. Kumamoto Seisyho High School L.S.C

See also
Women's football (soccer)
Women's football around the world
L. League
Empress's Cup
List of men's football clubs in Japan

References

Japan women

clubs